Live in Amsterdam may refer to:
 Live in Amsterdam (Toto album), 2003
 Live in Amsterdam (Fishbone album), 2005
 Live in Amsterdam (Candy Dulfer album)
 Live in Amsterdam (Beth Hart and Joe Bonamassa album), 2014